A skateboard is a type of configuration for automotive chassis, used for automotive platforms of battery electric vehicles. The skateboard chassis includes a base structure or a platform, which houses the batteries, electric motors and other electronic components fundamental to an electric vehicle. It also has removable and replaceable corner units at the wheels, into which the suspension, steering, powertrain and braking functions are embedded. 

A skateboard chassis cuts down the cost and complexity of manufacturing and production of electric vehicles, as it is a self-contained platform, with all the necessary driving and electronic components integrated into it, and which can be mounted with a variety of bodies after scaling them into various sizes. Electric vehicles are still low-volume production commodities, and this makes them expensive to fabricate or assemble. The skateboard allows an automaker to design and manufacture vehicles in several vehicle categories and body segments without engineering each one independently.

Examples 
Tesla Skateboard, a platform family based on the skateboard chassis configuration, used for the Model S/X and Model 3/Y sub-platforms.
Volkswagen Group MEB platform
Hyundai E-GMP
General Motors BEV3 platform
Geely SEA platform
 Rivian Skateboard
 Bollinger Skateboard, the chassis basis for Bollinger's vehicles, and a product sold to coachbuilders.
 XPeng SEPA (Smart Electric Platform Architecture).
 Foxconn MIH, a platform developed by Foxconn for use by vehicle manufacturers and not itself.
Gaussin Road truck skateboard
REE Engineering
Cenntro iChassis
VIA Motors VDRIVE™ Skateboard

See Also
 Modular vehicle

References

Automotive terminology